Elkan William Tio Baggott (born 23 October 2002) is an Indonesian professional footballer who plays as a centre-back for League One club Cheltenham Town, on loan from Ipswich Town, and the Indonesia national team.

Born in Thailand and raised in England, Baggott represents his mother's country of Indonesia, where he first learned to play football as a child.

Early life
Baggott was born in Bangkok, Thailand, to an Indonesian mother and an English father and chose to represent Indonesia internationally.
Baggott attended the British School Jakarta in 2008.
He learned to play football at the Soccer School Jakarta and was appointed as captain for his British International School squad. His family eventually decided to settle in England in 2011.

Club career

Ipswich Town
Having joined Ipswich Town on a two-year scholarship in 2019, Baggott made his senior debut for the club on 6 October 2020, in a 2–0 victory over Gillingham in the EFL Trophy. On 28 January 2021, Baggott penned his first professional contract with Ipswich, signing a two-and-a-half-year contract with the option of an additional year's extension. On 16 April 2022, he became the first Indonesian player to play in an English professional league when he appeared for Ipswich Town in an EFL League One match against Rotherham United. Baggott signed a new three-year deal with the club in June 2022.

King's Lynn Town (loan)
On 22 March 2021, Baggott joined National League side King's Lynn Town on a youth loan for the remainder of the 2020–21 season. He made his debut for the club on 23 March 2021, playing 90 minutes in a 3–0 loss to Altrincham.

Gillingham (loan)
On 8 July 2022, Baggott joined League Two club Gillingham on a season-long loan deal. He made his league debut for the club on 30 July 2022 in a 2–0 away loss to AFC Wimbledon. On 15 October 2022, Baggott scored his first goal for Gillingham against Stevenage.

Cheltenham Town (loan)
In January 2023, Baggott was recalled from his loan at Gillingham and joined League One club Cheltenham Town on loan until the end of the season.

International career
Baggott has played for Indonesia at the under-19 level. He won his first cap for the under-19 team on 11 October 2020 in a friendly against North Macedonia U19. He received a call to join the senior Indonesian national football team in May 2021 but rejected it due to COVID-19 travel restrictions.

On 22 October 2021, the Chief of PSSI, Mochamad Iriawan, stated that Baggott had refused to play for Indonesia after rejecting multiple call-ups. Baggott immediately sent a letter to PSSI explaining his absence and his willingness to accept the next call-up, citing the fact that the COVID-19 situation in the United Kingdom and Indonesia have been much better. Iriawan openly accepted his explanation three days later.

On 16 November 2021, he made his debut for the senior team in a friendly match against Afghanistan. He played for 68 minutes and was substituted by Victor Igbonefo due to a concussion head injury, which resulted in an England Football Association mandatory 14 day 'no footballing activity' recuperation period. Elkan was cleared to play again on 2 December 2021, after a neurological MRI scan concluded no lasting damage. On 12 December 2021, Elkan made his senior team competitive debut against Laos in the AFF Suzuki Cup, played in Singapore. Indonesia won the match 5–1.  He scored his first goal for the national team on 19 December 2021, netting a header for the last goal of a 4–1 win against Malaysia.

Baggott again represented the senior national team at an AFC Finals qualification competition in Kuwait from 8 to 14 June. Baggott played in all 3 matches versus Kuwait (won 2-1), Jordan (lost 1-0) and Nepal (won 7-0). This performance helped Indonesia secure qualification for the Asian Cup being played in the summer of 2023. Baggott scored his 2nd international goal in the 7-0 win over Nepal.

Baggott was named in the provisional Indonesia squad for the 2022 AFF Championship but chose instead to stay with Gillingham during the busy December-January period of fixtures and with the Kent side bottom of League Two at the time of his call up.

Baggott was once again called up for the Indonesia squad for two friendlies against Burundi on 25 and 28 March 2023.

Career statistics

Club

International

As of match played 14 June 2022. Indonesia score listed first, score column indicates score after each Baggott goal.

List of international goals scored by Elkan Baggott

Honours
Indonesia
 AFF Championship runner-up: 2020

References

External links
 Elkan Baggott at Ipswich Town
 
 Elkan Baggott at PSSI

2002 births
Elkan Baggott
Living people
Indo people
Indonesian footballers
Indonesia international footballers
Indonesia youth international footballers
English footballers
British Asian footballers
Elkan Baggott
Indonesian people of English descent
English people of Indonesian descent
Elkan Baggott
Elkan Baggott
Association football defenders
Ipswich Town F.C. players
King's Lynn Town F.C. players
Gillingham F.C. players
Cheltenham Town F.C. players
English Football League players
National League (English football) players
Indonesian expatriate footballers